Parapedinella is a genus of heterokonts.

It includes a single species, Parapedinella reticulata.

References

Dictyochophyceae
Monotypic algae genera
Heterokont genera